Mikkel Christoffersen (born 10 August 1983) is a Danish former professional footballer who played as a centre-back.

Career 
Christoffersen played in the Danish Superliga for Herfølge Boldklub in 2006, and later also made 21 appearances for HB Køge at the highest level in the 2009–10 season.

Retirement
In 2018, he became principal at Brøndby Idrætsefterskole, a boarding school for lower secondary students with a focus on physical education.

Notes

1983 births
Living people
Danish men's footballers
Danish Superliga players
Association football defenders
Akademisk Boldklub players
Herfølge Boldklub players
Fremad Amager players
Boldklubben af 1893 players
Denmark Series players